Hendrickson Publishers is an American academic and reference book house founded in 1980. It is based in Peabody, Massachusetts.

History

The company was established on 12 May 1980 and incorporated in Massachusetts. Apart from working as book publisher, the company has also provided The New Testament on CD. In 2010, they were reported to be partnering with Gary and Carol Johnson for establishing a new fiction line.

Rose Publishing 
In 2017, Hendrickson acquired Rose Publishing as an imprint. Rose was established in 1991 by two teachers as a Christian publisher specializing in reference materials to support Bible studies. In 2021, Tyndale House Publishers acquired Hendrickson Publishers.

Notable publications

Dictionary of Christian Biography and Literature to the End of the Sixth Century, 1999, by William C. Piercy and Henry Wace, Dean of Canterbury.
Introduction to the New Testament in the Original Greek, 1988.
Thayer's Greek-English Lexicon of the New Testament, 2003, by Joseph Henry Thayer.
The Normal Christian Life, 2006, by Watchman Nee.

References

External links 
 On Findthecompany
 Hendrickson Publishers Welcomes Patricia Anders to Editorial Team

Book publishing companies based in Massachusetts
Companies based in Peabody, Massachusetts
Publishing companies established in 1980